The list below shows all of the autonomous communities and two autonomous cities of Spain. The list shown is from 2018 and is in Euros and International Dollar. Catalonia and Madrid are the largest communities in Spain in terms of GDP. Ceuta and Melilla are the smallest communities in Spain and are autonomous cities. In 2018, according to DatosMacro, the economies every community in the country grew with Madrid and Cantabria with 3,7% and 3,4% respectively, whilst Murcia, the worst performing, grew by just 1.5%.

List of autonomous communities by GDP 
A review of the economy of the autonomous communities was published in December 2019, slightly changing the position of all regions, the data of the GDP are fully updated, however, those of the PPP are not .

List of autonomous communities by GDP per capita
If you want to know more details, you can push here

See also 
 Autonomous communities of Spain
 Ranked list of Spanish autonomous communities

Notes 
 Annual average exchange rates: GDP (in US$), according to List of countries by GDP (UN). It is estimated that the average exchange rate is US$0.9213 per EUR€ in 2000 and US$1.2436 per EUR€ in 2005. US$1 is about equal to EUR€0.7543 in 2010.

References 

http://www.datosmacro.com/pib/espana-comunidades-autonomas| PIB de las Comunidades Autónomas

Autonomous communities by gross domestic product
Gross domestic product
Autonomous communities by gross domestic product
Gross state product